Víctor Jara is the second solo album by Chilean singer-songwriter Víctor Jara, released in 1967. It continues the nueva canción (new song) style of politically conscious folk music that he had established with his first solo namesake album, in 1966. The songs of Víctor Jara change from Jara's earlier autobiographical lyrics to topics of general concern for all of Latin America, growing closer to the style of Violeta Parra. Parra died shortly before the album was released, and Jara, her student and friend, stepped forward to fill the political void. After this album, Jara's subsequent work would become more explicitly political, espousing left-wing activism to advocate or protest specific political issues.

The album includes the controversial song, "El aparecido" (The Ghost), which was written about Che Guevara months before the Argentinian revolutionary was killed. The song says, "The crows with golden claws have put a price on his head / how the fury of the rich has crucified him."

Background 
In 1966, Víctor Jara met the group Quilapayun (formed for Eduardo Carrasco, Julio Carrasco, Carlos Quezada, Willy Oddó and Patricio Castillo), and they started a "musical society" that lasts several years and that would result in the recording of some albums, including it, and Canciones folklóricas de América. The album also had the musical support of the orchestra of Sergio Ortega and the artistic direction by Rubén Nouzeilles.

Release 
Víctor Jara was released in 1967 on Odeon Records label. The album was reissued under various alternative titles such as Mensaje, Desde Lonquen hasta siempre and El verso es una paloma. "El aparecido" was released as single with "Solo" as b-side in March of that year only in Chile.

Track listing
"El aparecido" (The Ghost) (Víctor Jara)
"El lazo" (The Lasso) (Víctor Jara)
"Qué alegres son las obreras" (How Happy Are the Women Workers)  (Bolivian folk)
"Despedimiento del angelito" (Farewell to the Little Angel)  (Chilean folk)
"Solo" (Alone) (Eduardo Carrasco)
"En algún lugar del puerto" (Some Place in the Port)(Víctor Jara)
"Así como hoy matan negros" (Thus They Kill Blacks Today) (Pablo Neruda - Sergio Ortega)
"El amor es un camino que de repente aparece" (Love Is a Road that Suddenly Appears) (Víctor Jara)
"Casi, casi" (Almost, Almost) (Chilean folk)
"Canción de cuna para un niño vago" (Lullaby for a Deserted Child) (Víctor Jara)
"Romance del enamorado y la muerte" (Song of the Lover and of Death) (Text: Anonymous – Víctor Jara)
"Ay mi palomita" (Ah, My Little Dove) (Chilean folk)

References

Víctor Jara albums
1967 albums
Spanish-language albums
Odeon Records albums
Warner Records albums